Below is a list of Missouri state high school baseball championships  sanctioned by the Missouri State High School Activities Association  since the organization began holding the tournaments in 1950. More recently, championships have been held at Meador Park in Springfield to 2012, and CarShield Field (formerly T.R. Hughes Ballpark) in O'Fallon from 2013. Since 2021, they are played at U.S. Baseball Park in Ozark, Missouri.

Championships

See also
 List of Missouri state high school football champions
 List of Missouri state high school boys basketball championships
 List of Missouri state high school girls basketball championships
 List of Missouri state high school girls volleyball championships
 List of Missouri high schools by athletic conferences

References

High school baseball in the United States
high school baseball
high school baseball